Thomas or Tom Farley may refer to:

Thomas Farley (manners expert), American manners expert
Thomas T. Farley (1934–2010), American politician and lawyer
Thomas W. Farley (born 1975), CEO of the New York Stock Exchange
Thomas Farley (physician), former commissioner of the New York City Department of Health and Mental Hygiene
 Tom Farley, Australian actor who appeared in the TV series Whiplash in 1960
 Lawrence Farley (1856–1910), known as Tom, American baseball player